Jordanite is a sulfosalt mineral with chemical formula  in the monoclinic crystal system, named after the German scientist H. Jordan (1808–1887) who discovered it in 1864.

Lead-grey in colour (frequently displaying an iridescent tarnish), its streak is black and its lustre is metallic. Jordanite has a hardness of 3 on Mohs scale, has a density of approximately 6.4, and a conchoidal fracture.

The type locality is the Lengenbach Quarry in the Binn Valley, Wallis, Switzerland.

References

Sulfosalt minerals
Lead minerals
Monoclinic minerals
Minerals in space group 11
Arsenic minerals
Antimony minerals